Antikainen is a Finnish surname, most prevalent in Northern Savonia. Notable people with the surname include:

 Toivo Antikainen (1898–1941), Finnish-born communist and military officer
 Eero Antikainen (1906–1960), Finnish sawmill worker, trade union leader and politician
 Sanna Antikainen (born 1988), Finnish politician

Finnish-language surnames
Surnames of Finnish origin